In linguistics, specifically articulatory phonetics, tongue shape describes the shape that the tongue assumes when it makes a sound. Because the sibilant sounds have such a high perceptual prominence, tongue shape is particularly important; small changes in tongue shape are easily audible and can be used to produce different speech sounds, even within a given language.

For non-sibilant sounds, the relevant variations in tongue shape can be adequately described by the concept of secondary articulation, in particular palatalization (raising of the middle of the tongue), velarization (raising of the back of the tongue) and pharyngealization (retracting of the root of the tongue). Usually, only one secondary articulation can occur for a given sound.

In addition, the acoustic quality of velarization and pharyngealization is very similar so no language contrasts the two.

Shape distinctions
The following varieties of tongue shapes are defined for sibilants, from sharpest and highest-pitched to dullest and lowest-pitched:

Grooved like : with a groove running down the centerline of the tongue. The groove channels a high-velocity jet of air into the teeth, which results in a high-pitched, piercing "hissing" sound.  Because of the prominence of the sounds, they are the most common and most stable of sibilants cross-linguistically. They occur in English and are denoted with a s or z, as in soon or zone.
Grooved palatalized like : Combination of grooved shape with palatalization, the raising/bowing of the middle of the tongue.
Alveolo-palatal like , or "flat" palatalized: with a convex, V-shaped tongue and highly palatalized.
Palato-alveolar like , or "domed:" with a "domed" tongue, convex and moderately palatalized. Such sounds occur in English and are denoted with sh, ch, g, j, or si, as in shin, chin, gin, and vision.
Retroflex like : with a flat or concave (curled back) tongue and no palatalization. Such sounds occur in a large number of varieties, some of which also go by other names such as "flat postalveolar" or "apico-alveolar." The , or "true retroflex," sounds are the very dullest and lowest-pitched of all the sibilants, and they have the greatest amount of concavity (the most curling back) of the tongue.

The last three types of sounds are often known as "hushing" sounds and occasionally as "shibilants" because of their quality, as opposed to the "hissing" grooved sounds. Palatalization is an inherent part of the definition of the above varieties and cannot normally be varied independently.

See also

Place of articulation
Manner of articulation
Phonation
Airstream mechanism
Relative articulation
List of phonetics topics
Vocal tract
Human voice
Source–filter model of speech production

References

Bibliography

Phonetics
Tongue
Place of articulation